Grave Party is the third album of the Greek metal band Saddolls. This album features a major
change in the band's sound, combining elements of Darkwave ebm with industrial metal. It also features a collaboration with Skinny Disco from the Swedish band Deathstars for the single Terminate me. The first single Lady Cry was also included at Sonic Seducer's compilation album Cold Hands Seduction Vol.254 that sold more than 60.000 copies in Germany.

Track listing

Band personnel 
 George Downloved – Vocals
 Paul Evilrose – Guitar
 J.Vitu – Guitar
 GB - Bass
 Dennis M. - Drums

Guest musician:
 Joanna David - Female Vocals
 Skinny Disco - Guest Vocals & Screams
 Dave Shadow - Guest Vocals
 M-Teo (Teo Buzz) - Additional Keyboards

Production personnel 
John McRis – Mastering
Mironized – Design
John McRis – Engineer
John McRis – Mixing

Videos

References

2014 albums
Saddolls albums